Madurantakam division is a revenue division in the Kanchipuram district of Tamil Nadu, India. It comprises the taluks of Cheyyur and Madurantakam.

References
 

Kanchipuram district